Pedro Mir is a Santo Domingo Metro station on Line 2. It was open on 1 April 2013 as part of the inaugural section of Line 2 between María Montez and Eduardo Brito. The station is located between Ulises Francisco Espaillat and Freddy Beras Goico.

This is an underground station built below Avenida John F. Kennedy. It is named in honor of Pedro Mir.

References

Santo Domingo Metro stations
2013 establishments in the Dominican Republic
Railway stations opened in 2013